Teresa Strinasacchi (1768–1838), was an Italian opera singer. She was engaged in the Divadlo v Kotcích in 1793–1797, where she was the prima donna at the time.

References 

 Starší divadlo v českých zemích do konce 18. století. Osobnosti a díla, ed. A. Jakubcová, Praha: Divadelní ústav – Academia 2007

1768 births
1838 deaths
18th-century Italian women opera singers